The Liga ABF 2008–09 was the 52nd season of women's handball top flight in Spain since its establishment, running from 13 September 2008. to 23 May 2009. SD Itxako won the championship for the first time with a seven points advantage over Balonmano Sagunto. CBF Elda, Bera Bera, Mar Alicante and CB Elche followed in European positions, while CB Zuazo and CBF Monóvar were relegated.

Standings

References

División de Honor Femenina de Balonmano seasons
ABF
2008–09 domestic handball leagues
2008 in women's handball
2009 in women's handball